Waikari is a small town in the Canterbury region of New Zealand's South Island.

Its Anglican parish church is the Church of Ascension, 79 Princes Street, Waikari, where William Orange was vicar in the 1920s.

Waikari is located on State Highway 7 near the Weka Pass and was served by the Waiau Branch railway from 6 April 1882 until its closure on 15 January 1978.  The section of the railway through the Weka Pass has been retained by the Weka Pass Railway and preserved trains operate between Waipara and Waikari.

The town is also located near the site of Māori cave art and rock drawings in the Weka Pass Reserve.

Demographics
Waikari is included in Upper Hurunui statistical area.

Waikari had a population of 264 at the 2018 New Zealand census, unchanged since the 2013 census, and an increase of 12 people (4.8%) since the 2006 census. There were 120 households. There were 141 males and 126 females, giving a sex ratio of 1.12 males per female, with 36 people (13.6%) aged under 15 years, 27 (10.2%) aged 15 to 29, 123 (46.6%) aged 30 to 64, and 78 (29.5%) aged 65 or older.

Ethnicities were 92.0% European/Pākehā, 11.4% Māori, 4.5% Pacific peoples, and 2.3% other ethnicities (totals add to more than 100% since people could identify with multiple ethnicities).

Although some people objected to giving their religion, 52.3% had no religion, 37.5% were Christian and 2.3% had other religions.

Of those at least 15 years old, 15 (6.6%) people had a bachelor or higher degree, and 75 (32.9%) people had no formal qualifications. The employment status of those at least 15 was that 84 (36.8%) people were employed full-time, 36 (15.8%) were part-time, and 9 (3.9%) were unemployed.

Education

Notable people
 Derek Quigley, politician

References

External links

Information about Waikari
8mm Forum: Waikari Cinema

Populated places in Canterbury, New Zealand
Hurunui District